Suncorp Super Netball is the top level netball league featuring teams from Australia. In 2017 it replaced the ANZ Championship, which also included teams from New Zealand, as the top level netball league in Australia. Since 2019, the league has been governed, on behalf of Netball Australia, by an independent commission. Its main sponsor is Suncorp Group. In 2017, Sunshine Coast Lightning were the inaugural Suncorp Super Netball winners.

History

Formation
In May 2016, Netball Australia and Netball New Zealand announced that the ANZ Championship would be discontinued after the 2016 season. In Australia it was replaced by Suncorp Super Netball and in New Zealand it was replaced by the ANZ Premiership. The founding members of Suncorp Super Netball included the five former Australian ANZ Championship teams – Adelaide Thunderbirds, Melbourne Vixens, New South Wales Swifts, Queensland Firebirds and West Coast Fever  – plus three brand new franchises; Collingwood Magpies, Giants Netball and Sunshine Coast Lightning.

Inaugural Champions
With a team coached by Noeline Taurua, captained by Geva Mentor and also featuring Caitlin Bassett, Karla Pretorius and Stephanie Wood, Sunshine Coast Lightning finished the 2017 season as inaugural champions after defeating Giants Netball 65–48 in the grand final. In 2018 they retained the title after defeating West Coast Fever 62–59  in the grand final.

Recent Champions
2019
In 2019, Briony Akle guided New South Wales Swifts to their first  Suncorp Super Netball title. Despite losing their new captain, Maddy Proud, to injury early in the season, Swifts finished the regular season in second place. In the major semi-final, they lost to Sunshine Coast Lightning. However, they then defeated Melbourne Vixens in the preliminary final. In the grand final they faced Lightning again but this time defeated them 64–47 to emerge as champions.

2020
In 2020, with a team coached again by Simone McKinnis and co-captained by Kate Moloney and Liz Watson , Melbourne Vixens finished the season as both minor premiers and overall champions. In the grand final they defeated West Coast Fever 66–64.

2021
In 2021 with a team coached by Briony Akle and co-captained by Maddy Proud and Paige Hadley, New South Wales Swifts won their second Suncorp Super Netball title. In the grand final they defeated Giants Netball 63–59.

2022
In 2022, head coach Dan Ryan and captain Courtney Bruce led West Coast Fever to their first premiership. In the grand final they defeated Melbourne Vixens 70-59.

Teams

Grand Finals

Minor premierships

Premiership winning coaches

Premiership winning captains

Broadcasting

Commission
In January 2019, Netball Australia announced it would form an independent commission to become the governing body of Suncorp Super Netball. In April 2019 they named five commissioners which included Marne Fechner, Netball Australia's CEO. Two more commissioners were appointed in May and August 2019.

Sponsorship
In October 2016, Suncorp Group was announced as Netball Australia's principal partner from 2017 to 2021. The agreement included naming rights to the new league. In August 2021 this agreement was renewed for another five years. Other sponsorship partners include the Australian Institute of Sport,  Nissan Australia, Origin Energy, HCF, ASICS,  Cadbury and Gilbert Netball.

Awards
 Player of the Year
 Grand Final MVP
 Young Star
 Leading Goalscorer
 Team of the Year

References

External links
 

 
 
2017 establishments in Australia
Sports leagues established in 2017
Professional sports leagues in Australia